Sandy Robertson may refer to:
Sandy Robertson (footballer, born 1860), Scottish football player for Preston North End
Sandy Robertson (footballer, born 1878)
Sandy Robertson (footballer, born 1971), Scottish football player for Rangers

See also
Alexander Robertson (disambiguation)